Serge Becker (born in Paris) is a Swiss creative director, nightlife and hospitality designer, and impresario. He is known for his irreverent approach to design, adventurous programming of venues, and a multicultural audience. Becker is part of a second wave of New York City restaurateurs, that incorporated nightlife and theatrical elements into their design driven venues. A tightly curated guest list, staff casting, styling, and expert music selection were essential elements to this generation of hospitality operators, in addition to the traditional culinary focus. Becker in particular is known for using vernacular design references and transforming previously “undesirable spaces and locations” with a Cinderella effect. Becker was dubbed a “Cultural Engineer” by André Balazs in the New York Times for his innovative creations and prescient timing.

Biography 
Born in Paris in 1961 and raised in Zürich from age 8. Serge Becker is the son of Ruth Becker, a Swiss Theatre and TV administrator and a Vietnamese Father. He studied graphic design at Kunstgewerbeschule Zürich from 1977-1982.

While studying he worked at night as a DJ at popular local clubs. Together with photographer Pietro Mattioli he selected records at one of Zürich’s early punk evenings, documented in the book 1977. In the early 80’s he started to book early New York City rap performers like Kurtis Blow, Davey D, and Grandmaster DST to help introduce this burgeoning culture to Switzerland.

Inspired by that raw energy, he moved to New York City in 1982, where he started a 3-year stint as art director at the art nightclub AREA. This led to a 15 year long creative partnership with AREA co-founder Eric Goode. Together they designed and operated seminal New York City clubs and restaurants, directed music videos, and produced art and photography.

In 1998 Becker joined George C. Wolfe, Josh Pickard and Paul Salmon to open Joe's Pub at The Public Theater. The same year he started the multi-disciplinary design firm Can Resources with architect Derek Sanders and creative director Lisa Ano (of M & Co.). The office designed multiple commercial and residential projects including the beloved Flower Box Building in the East Village.

In 2000 Ano and Becker also launched the critically acclaimed cult magazine List, a publication presenting all content in list format. It was an instant hit but the magazine and Can Resources both fell victim to the dot-com bubble crash and 9/11.

In 2004 Becker and Sanders joined artists Thomas Sandbichler and Jeff Gompertz to open the multi-media art club Volume in North Williamsburg, Brooklyn. The short-lived venue was a trailblazer for the coming development of the neighborhood and set a high standard for innovative immersive cultural programming.

In 2005 Becker and Sanders opened the Mexican restaurant and bar La Esquina which introduced an authentic Mexico City style menu in a theatrical speakeasy environment.

In 2007 Becker joined Simon Hammerstein and Richard Kimmel to open the Neo-Burlesque theatre The Box, and in 2008 Becker went back to his roots to open the Swiss Restaurant “Café Select” with his Swiss friends Oliver Stumm and Dominique Clausen of “A touch of Class” DJ and production team.

In 2011 Becker connected with his Joe’s Pub partner Paul Salmon, the brothers Binn and Genc Jakupi and Meriem Soliman to open the Jamaican concept venue Miss Lily’s.

In 2012 Becker ventured to London to open Mexican restaurant La Bodega Negra with local restaurateur Will Ricker and entrepreneur Eddie Spencer Churchill.

2016 brought a career change for Becker as he was appointed creative and artistic director of the New York Museum of Sex by owner Dan Gluck. His extensive brief was to help Gluck expand the museum into a full two building, eight gallery institution, broaden the curatorial scope, and build a robust events program. He was also tasked with helping Gluck conceptualize, curate, design, and build “Superfunland”, a cheeky large-scale immersive “journey into the erotic carnival” that opened in late 2019 to massive crowds and positive reviews.

Nightclubs, Restaurants, Hotels 

 1983-1987 AREA Nightclub
 1988 MK Nightclub with Eric Goode, Jennifer Goode, André Balazs, Katie Ford, Aby Rosen, Michael Fuchs
 1989 BC Nightclub in Los Angeles with Eric Goode, André Balazs, Bret Witke
 1990 Time Café and Fez with Eric Goode, Josh Pickard, Aby Rosen, Michael Fuchs
 1992 Club USA with Eric Goode for Peter Gatien
 1992 Tunnel Nightclub with Eric Goode for Peter Gatien
 1992 The Mercer Hotel master plan co-designers for André Balazs
 1994 B Bar & Grill with Eric Goode
 1994 Jones Hollywood for Sean MacPhearson
 1994 Good Luck Bar for Sean MacPhearson
 1998 Joe's Pub at The Public Theater with Josh Pickard, Paul Salmon, Kevin Abbott; the seminal, intimate Downtown Manhattan venue, presenting US premieres of Alicia Keys, Amy Winehouse, Adele, Antony and the Johnsons, Tinariwen, Šaban Bajramović, among many others.
 2004 Volume Club with Thomas Sandbichler, Jeff Gompertz, Derek Sanders; innovative multi-media culture space responsible for US premieres of Dizzee Rascal, Franz Ferdinand, N.E.R.D., Williamsburg Dodge Ball Tournament.
 2004 Lure Fishbar for John McDonald, Josh Pickard, Josh Capon
 2005 La Esquina Restaurant with Derek Sanders, Ily Hümer, Cordell Lochin, James Gersten
 2007 The Box Cabaret Club with Simon Hammerstein, Richard Kimmel, Randy Weiner
 2008 Café Select with Oliver Stumm, Dominique Clausen
 2011 Miss Lily's Soho with Paul Salmon, Binn Jakupi, Genc Jakupi, Meriem Soliman; innovative Jamaican cultural concept including restaurant, organic juice bar, record store, art gallery, radio station.
 2012 Bodega Negra London with Will Ricker, Eddie Spencer Churchill
 2013 Miss Lily's 7A
 2014 Bodega Negra New York with Noah Teppenberg and Strategic Group
 2015 Miss Lily's Dubai with Varun Khemaney, Khalil Damash
 2018 Alley Cat Amateur Theatre at Beekman Hotel with Tom Colicchio 
 2018 Miss Lily's Negril at Skylark Hotel for Paul Salmon
 2019 Bodega Negra Doha with Will Ricker
 2019 Indochine Dubai with Jean Marc Houmard, Varun Khemaney, Khalil Damash
 2021 LMNO Philadelphia with Stephen Starr

Museums and Galleries 

 2009 Swiss Institute New York, Design of Sculptural Reading Room 
 2013 “AREA: The Exhibition”, Group Show, The Hole Gallery, curated by Jeffrey Deitch and Glenn O'Brien; Production Design
 2016-2020 Creative and Artistic Director Museum of Sex, New York; Overseeing program, design and execution In collaboration with curator Lissa Rivera and founder Dan Gluck

Exhibitions  

 2016 "Night Fever" New York Disco 1977-1979 The Bill Bernstein Photographs
 2016 "Sex Lives of Animals"
 2017 “Known/ Unknown" Private obsession and hidden desire in Outsider Art
 2017 "NSFW - Female Gaze"
 2017 "Canon" Juan Jose Garboza & Gubo Andrew Mroczek
 2017 "Zana Bayne" Stage Costume Anthology 
 2017 "Celestial Bodies" the couples Virtual Reality experience with Diplo
 2018 "The Incomplete Araki" Life and death in the work of Nobuyoshi Araki
 2018 "Leonor Fini" Theatre of Desire 1930-1990
 2018 "Punk Lust" Raw provocation 1971-1985
 2019 "Stag" the illicit origins of pornographic film
 2019 "Mariette Pathy Allen" Rites of Passage 1978-2006
 2019 "James Bidgood" Reveries
 2019 "Superfunland" Journey into the Erotic Carnival

Publications  

 2000 List Magazine an anthology of lists with co-editor Lisa Ano

Art Direction and Production Design 

 1992 "I’m a frayed knot" (Gary Indiana) Rivington Theatre; Production design
 1993 "Dido and Aneas" Opera at the Academy; Production design
 2002  "60 Years Capitol Records" campaign; Creative direction

Music Videos and Film Direction 

 1992 Nine Inch Nails "Help me I’m in Hell"
 1992 Nine Inch Nails "Pinion"
 1993 MTV "Alternative Nation" title sequence
 1993 Digital Orgasm "Time to Believe"
 1994 CeCe Peniston "Hit by Love"
 1994 Messiah "I feel Love"
 1994 Terrorvision "Oblivion"
 1998 Robbie Robertson "Unbound"
 2019 "The Origins of the Fair" - A Panoramic History with Lissa Rivera

References

Living people
American restaurateurs
French restaurateurs
1961 births